You Wish! is a 2003 Disney Channel Original Movie, based on Jackie French Koller's 1991 novel If I Had One Wish. The film was directed by Paul Hoen; it stars A. J. Trauth, Spencer Breslin, Lalaine and Tim Reid. The film was filmed in Auckland, New Zealand. It was released on January 10, 2003, on the Disney Channel.

Plot
16-year-old Alex Lansing is extremely tormented by his younger brother, Stevie because Stevie  has played pranks on Alex, such as buying a turkey from a pet adoption show and making Harbour High Jocks named Gary and his friends slam a pizza on Alex's head. Most recently, Alex is forced to take Stevie to the mall with him and his friends Abby and James. Stevie  receives a magical coin from Larry Pendragon, an eccentric but kindly man, who allows him to wish anything, and runs off in the mall without telling Alex. Their parents angrily punish Alex, having enough with his carelessness with Stevie, and send Alex to bed early. After Stevie gives Alex the coin, Alex upsettingly wishes that he had never had a little brother.

The next day, he wakes up, only to find that his wish has come true. Stevie is now a famous child actor named Terrence Russell McCormack who stars on a TV show named Where's Stevie?. Although a cheerleader is his girlfriend now and he is mostly popular in school, Alex soon regrets a few things and that his new popular jock friends including Gary are now tormenting his former friends Abby and James, Alex's new pet dog is nothing but creepy & snores while sleeps & Fiona the cheerleader is also revealed to be crude, mean, and bossy. After a while, Alex began to miss Stevie because their parents are career-obsessed, which makes him feel lonely at his home. After being kicked out of Terrance's dressing room because Terrance thinks he is crazy when he tells him about him being Stevie, Alex reflects on his life with Stevie and realizes how much he cares about him and misses him. As Alex walks home, Terrance drives by and decides to walk with Alex, who he considers his friend despite thinking he is crazy. The two escape from Terrance's driver and after realizing that this happened because of the coin, Alex and Terrance (who is convinced of the truth by Alex) set out to find the coin, enlisting the help of Abby after Alex convinces her they were friends prior to his wish. The three locate the man who gave Stevie the coin, but he was injured without Stevie there to save him and had to close his shop and sold off the coin.

After saying goodbye to Abby, Alex and Terrance are caught by the police and are taken to Alex's home where Terrance's caretaker comes to get him with the intention of covering up his running away. Terrance gets a call from his mother and is excited as he had the best night of his life, but quickly loses his excitement when learns that his mother is getting remarried. Alex and Terrance share a brotherly hug and say goodbye and Alex slips into a depression because he has no chance of returning to his world.

The next day, while Alex is trying to find something on TV that does not remind him of his relationship with Stevie, his father gives him a bunch of old coins he bought to try to cheer him up, but Alex throws them across the room, then discovers that one is the magic coin. Alex gets it, but his shout of excitement frightens his parents due to his emotional state and they decide to break his door down when he refuses to open it. Before they can, Alex wishes that he never made the first wish and wakes up back in his own world with none of it having ever happened. Alex excitedly embraces Stevie and his friends and asks out Abby, who he became attracted to while in the other world, while yelling to a passing Fiona that he is not her boyfriend, and everyone is confused with his excitement. Later, Alex, James and Abby go skating and take Stevie with them and try to teach him to skate. He gives up, but then uses the coin to become a great skater.

Cast
 A.J. Trauth as Alex Lansing
 Spencer Breslin as Stevie Lansing / Terrence Russell McCormack
 Lalaine as Abby Ramirez
 Tim Reid as Larry Pendragon
 Peter Feeney as David Carl "Dave" Lansing
 Joshua Leys as Gary
 Sally Stockwell as Pam Lansing
 Ari Boyland as James Cooper
 Emma Lahana as Fiona
 Jay Ryan as Charles
 Jodie Rimmer as Zoe
 Stephen Butterworth as Ronald

Credits adapted from Rotten Tomatoes.

Critical reception
Writing for Los Angeles Times, Mark Sachs praised You Wish! for its cast, script, and direction, calling the film "one of the best efforts of the basic cable outfit's original-movie franchise".

Soundtrack
The soundtrack included numerous songs, including:
"You Wish!" performed by Lalaine
"Now And Again" performed by Mavin (as Badge)
"A Thousand Miles" performed by Vanessa Carlton
"Life is Good" performed by Junk
"World of Our Own" performed by Westlife
"Follow My Heart" performed by Reo Speedwagon

References

External links
 

2003 television films
2003 films
American alternate history films
American teen comedy films
Disney Channel Original Movie films
2000s fantasy comedy films
Films about wish fulfillment
Films based on American novels
Films directed by Paul Hoen
Films shot in New Zealand
2000s English-language films
2000s American films